Mukhauta is a Nepali movie which features gangster life in thamel how the two gangs use their power against other people.

Cast 
Sunil Thapa as Mr D
Rajesh Hamal as Manish
Robin Tamang as Chepang
Arpan Thapa as Pundit 
Saugat Malla as Ravi
Nisha Adhikari as Pandit's Girlfriend 
Harshika Shrestha as Ravi's Girlfriend 
Dayahang Rai as Police Officer
Prasant Tamrakar 
Pradeep Dhakal 
Saroj Bhakrel

Songs

References

2014 films
Films shot in Kathmandu
Nepalese action films